Founded in England in 1926, Thomas Swan & Co. Ltd. is a leading independent manufacturer of performance and fine chemicals.  The company manufactures over 100 products, from kilogram to multi-tonne quantities, and offers an experienced and flexible custom manufacturing service.  With offices in the United States and China and a global network of distributors, Thomas Swan exports to over 80 countries worldwide and is well placed to service British and international markets.

History
Thomas Swan & Co. Ltd. was founded by ‘Tommy’ Swan at its present site in Consett, County Durham in the North East of England.  From early beginnings as a road surfacing company, using the waste product (slag) from the local steel industry as a raw material, Thomas Swan has diversified into a wide range of performance chemical products and processes.

External links

1926 establishments in England
Chemical companies of the United Kingdom
Companies based in County Durham
Chemical companies established in 1926
Privately held companies of England